Laura Peery (born  1952 in Washington, D.C.) is an American ceramic artist.

Career
She works with porcelain and has used techniques such as canvas imprinting to get texture on to clay.

Her work has been displayed at Smithsonian American Art Museum, and Convergence Gallery in New York City.

References

1952 births
American ceramists
Living people